This is a list of seasons completed by the Dinamo Riga.  This list documents the records and playoff results for all season the Dinamo Riga have completed since their inception in 2008.

Note: GP = Games played, W = Wins, L = Losses, OTW = Overtime/shootout wins, OTL = Overtime/shootout losses, Pts = Points, GF = Goals for, GA = Goals against, PIM = Penalties in minutes

References
 

 
Dinamo Riga seasons